A canon is a structured hymn used in a number of Eastern Orthodox services.  It consists of nine odes, based on the Biblical canticles. Most of these are found in the Old Testament, but the final ode is taken from the Magnificat and Song of Zechariah from the New Testament.

The roots of this type of hymn go as far back as the 5th century, reaching maturity in the Greek language through the work of St. Andrew of Crete, whose penitential Great Canon is still used on certain occasions during Great Lent. It was further developed in the 8th century by Sts. John of Damascus and  Cosmas of Jerusalem, and in the 9th century by Sts.  Joseph the Hymnographer and  Theophanes the Branded.

Each canon develops a specific theme, such as repentance or honouring a particular saint. Sometimes more than one canon can be chanted together, as frequently happens at Matins.

Biblical canticles and origins 
The nine biblical canticles are:
 The Ode of Moses in Exodus
 The Ode of Moses in Deuteronomy (Note: this is sung only on Tuesdays in Lent)
 The Prayer of Anna the mother of Samuel the Prophet
 The Prayer of Habakkuk the Prophet (Habakkuk )
 The Prayer of Isaiah the Prophet (Isaiah )
 The Prayer of Jonah the Prophet (Jonah )
 The Prayer of the Three Holy Children (Daniel 3:26-56)*
 The Song of the Three Holy Children (The Benedicite, Daniel 3:57-88)*
 The Song of the Theotokos (The Magnificat, Luke ) and the Prayer of Zacharias the father of the Forerunner (The Benedictus)

*These odes are found only in the Septuagint. Verse numberings according to Psalter, which differs from Brenton.

Nowadays, however, the canticles are only sung in large monasteries or, in Russian practice, with the triode  on the weekdays of Lent.

20th century scholarship generally agreed that the canon was invented in the late 7th century by Andrew of Crete, a view supported by prominent Byzantine musicologist Egon Wellesz. Via his translation of the Jerusalem Georgian Chantbook, Stephen Shoemaker demonstrates that this form of hymn was already in place by the early 5th century, challenging the prevailing model of Byzantine musical development. Frøyshov independently concurs based on the same evidence; "the Ancient Iadgari proves conclusively that the kanon genre was not invented in the 7th-8th centuries" and "in all probability appeared in the 4th-5th centuries."

Performance 
As with all other Orthodox church music, a canon is sung by a choir or cantor in a cappella chant. An ode of the canon is begun by singing the Biblical canticle from its beginning. ( means "coming down" and the verse is so called because as originally performed the two choirs would descend from their places on the left and right sides of the church to sing it together in the middle.)

Nearly all canons have only eight odes, the second ode generally being omitted since its canticle is quite penitential and so used only on the triode of the Tuesdays of Great Lent as well as in a few canons of an archaic style such as the aforementioned Great Canon.

Because a canon is composed of nine odes, it can be conveniently divided into three sections. Between Ode III and Ode IV, a sedalen or "sitting hymn" is sung. If an akathist is to be chanted in conjunction with a canon, it is inserted after Ode VI.

The typical order for a full canon, as currently, in most places, chanted at matins is as follows:
Ode I
Ode III
Little Litany
Kathisma Hymn
Ode IV
Ode V
Ode VI
Little Litany
Kathisma Hymn
(Synaxarion)
Ode VII
Ode VIII
Magnificat
Ode IX
Little Litany
Exapostilarion

Modern arrangement 

Theoretically, each ode has fourteen (or occasionally sixteen), with some  repeated if the service books do not provide enough of them and some conjoined if there are too many. This makes the canon too lengthy for typical parish use, so fewer are sung or in Russian practice, read.

Usage 
Canons are used most notably at Matins, but also at the Midnight Office for Sunday; at Great and Small Compline; and at special services such as the Paraklesis and those of similar structure such as the Panichida and Moleben. The Greek equivalent of a Moleben is the Paraklesis, during which a full canon is still chanted. Canons may also be used in private prayer either as a regular part of a rule or for special needs. One traditional prayerful preparation for reception of the Eucharist is to read three canons and an akathist the evening prior. When used privately there is generally no attempt at an elaborated musical or metrical performance, and may be read silently.

Abbreviated canons 
Sometimes abbreviated canons are used. A canon consisting of only four odes is called a tetraode; a canon consisting of only three odes is called a triode. In both of these types of canons, the last two odes are always the VIIIth and IXth. The preceding odes may vary with the day of the week. For instance, during Great Lent, the Lenten Triodion provides triodes at Matins on Monday through Friday: on Mondays they consist of Odes I, VIII and IX, on Tuesdays, Odes II, VIII and IX, and so on through Friday which consists of Odes V, VIII and IX. The Saturdays of Great Lent have tetraodes, consisting of Odes VI, VII, VIII and IX. Because the use of triodes is so prevalent during Great Lent, the book containing the changeable portions of services that liturgical season is called the Triodion. In the Russian Orthodox Church, for arcane historical reasons, the Pentecostarion is called the Flowery Triodion even though it contains no triodes. Triodes and tetraodes are also found during certain Forefeasts and Afterfeasts.

Poetic and musical structure 
The Biblical odes are not identical in meter, and so although all the music is performed in the same mode each ode must comprise an individual composition. However, in the original Greek compositions, the irmos and troparia would by design be of the same meter and so could use the same melody. The meter and acrostic would be given along with the canon's title.

This structure is now generally lacking in more recently composed canons, especially when the canons are composed in languages other than Greek to some setting other than Byzantine chant, and since it is now expected that large portions of the canon will be read rather than sung. Although some newer canons also contain acrostics, they are less frequent than they once were.

Texts 

Various collections of canons can also be found, as well as publications of individual canons in pamphlet form.

See also 
Kanon Pokajanen

Notes

References

Bibliography 

Brenton, Sir Lancelot C.L. (1986). The Septuagint with Apocrypha: Greek and English (reprint). Hendrickson Publishers. .
Conomos, Dimitri (1996). Orthodox Byzantine Music. Retrieved December 31, 2005.
Archimandrite Ephrem (2005). Canons. Retrieved October 23, 2017.
Fekula, Peter and Williams, Matthew (1997). The Order of Divine Services according to the usage of the Russian Orthodox Church (2nd ed.). Liberty: Saint John of Kronstadt Press. .

Rassaphore monk Laurence (1997). The Unabbreviated Horologion (2nd ed. 2nd printing with corrections). Jordanville: Holy Trinity Monastery.
Mother Mary and Ware, Kallistos (Tr.)(1998). The Festal Menaion (reprint). South Canaan: St. Tikhon's Seminary Press. .
Psalter According to the Seventy, The (1987). Boston: Holy Transfiguration Monastery. .

External links 
 The Great Canon of St. Andrew of Crete
 The Iambic Canon of Pentecost with notes, an example of a canon giving both original meter and acrostic.
 The Paschal Canon with extensive notes

Byzantine music
Genres of Byzantine music
Eastern Christian hymns
Greek music
Liturgy of the Hours
Christian prayer